Providence Hospital may refer to:
Providence Hospital (Columbia, South Carolina)
Providence Hospital (Mobile) in Mobile, Alabama
Providence Hospital (Southfield), Michigan
Providence Hospital (Washington, D.C.) in Washington, D.C.
Providence Alaska Medical Center in Anchorage, Alaska
Providence Behavioral Health Hospital in Holyoke, Massachusetts
Providence Continuing Care Centre in Kingston, Ontario
Providence Holy Cross Medical Center in Mission Hills, California
Providence Lying-In Hospital in Providence, Rhode Island
Providence Newberg Medical Center in Newberg, Oregon
Providence Portland Medical Center in Portland, Oregon
Providence Sacred Heart Medical Center and Children's Hospital, in and around Spokane, Washington
Providence Saint Joseph Medical Center in Burbank, California
Providence St. Peter Hospital in Olympia, Washington
Providence St. Vincent Medical Center in Portland, Oregon
Providence Tarzana Medical Center in Tarzana, California
Providence Willamette Falls Medical Center in Oregon City, Oregon

See also
Provident Hospital (disambiguation)
Providence Healthcare (disambiguation)